House of Cosbys is an American animated sitcom created by Justin Roiland for the film festival Channel 101. The series centers on Mitchell Reynolds (Jeff Davis), who builds a cloning machine to make duplicates of his favorite comedian, Bill Cosby. The show stars Davis, Roiland, and a rotating cast of performers, many of whom were participants at Channel 101. The series premiered January 30, 2005, and was the number one-rated program on the site for three months. Four episodes of the series were created, which debuted at Channel 101 screenings and were posted online thereafter. The series concluded on June 26, 2005 with an "unofficial" fifth installment.

The series garnered media attention when lawyers for Cosby sent Roiland and site administrator Dan Harmon a cease and desist letter in June 2005, which resulted in the series' ending.

Plot
The series revolves around Mitchell Reynolds (Davis), a fan of comedian Bill Cosby who, using one of Cosby's hairs, spends a decade crafting a cloning machine to create his dream: a "house of Cosbys". Each duplicate contains random and mild attributes, such as curiosity and dancing. He then begins cloning several more Cosbys to help him around the house, much like in the plot of the 1996 film Multiplicity. However, the quality of the clones seems to deteriorate as the process is repeated, and he decides to stop using the machine; but when one of the clones subversively activates it, he discovers that every tenth Cosby he clones has super powers. At the suggestion of Data Analysis Cosby (the first super-powered Cosby) they decide to continue cloning Cosbys so that their super powers can be used to help the world.

Many participants of Channel 101 gave voices to the series, including Rob Schrab, Steve Agee, and all three members of The Lonely Island.

Characters

The following is a list of the Cosby clones.

Other characters

History

Justin Roiland first began working in television in the early 2000s, mainly producing reality television programs. He and his close friends, Sevan Najarian and Abed Gheith, were more interested in creating comedic short films, and would work on them at his apartment in spare time. In 2003, they began submitting their projects to Channel 101, a non-profit monthly short film festival in Los Angeles, in which participants submit a short film in the format of a pilot under five minutes in length. After submitting several films, he began working on House of Cosbys, which originated between him, Gheith, and another close friend Steven Chunn, doing poor impressions of Bill Cosby. While the original idea was similar in setup to the sitcom The Brady Bunch—consisting of multiple Cosbys together in a home—it eventually evolved into its final form with more development. Roiland deemed the concept "Multiplicity meets The Smurfs meets the original concept."

He wrote the first episode and began working on it alongside Gheith, Najarian, and Chunn. Roiland and Chunn would design and draw characters and scan them into a computer, where they could be further manipulated in Adobe Photoshop. From there, Najarian would digitally animate the drawings using Adobe After Effects. As the series progressed, he enlisted friends Myke Chilian to help with character design and background art, respectively. Roiland later likened it to "our own little animation studio." The first episode debuted at a screening on January 30, 2005, and received a wildly supportive reaction from the audience. Two more episodes were created over the following two months, where it remained the most popular show at each screening. By the fourth episode, Roiland fell ill with bronchitis, which resulted in what they felt was a subpar installment. Following this, a "perfect storm" of things helped lead to the ending of the series: Roiland had a close friend die in a car accident, which was "traumatizing" for him, he and his small team grew exhausted with making the series, and he and Channel 101's site administrator Dan Harmon received a cease and desist letter from Bill Cosby's attorney in June 2005:

Although he scripted a fifth installment of the series, a mockumentary about receiving the letter, he decided to end the series. Roiland attributed much of his reluctance to continue not on the prospect of potential legal action, but the passing of his friend. He gave the script to friends Chester Tam, and Chris Romano and Eric Falconer, who produced an "unofficial" fifth episode of House of Cosbys.

Despite no longer making the series, Cosby's lawyers insisted that the online distributors of the episodes—Channel101.com and Roiland's own site, ComicSacrifice.com—take them down. Harmon initially pulled the episodes from the site, but re-uploaded them shortly thereafter upon realizing their requests were unreasonable. He was forced to take them down when Cosby's lawyers went to the company that maintained the server for the site, CI Host. Harmon noted that the shorts were widely available on other video sites in a post on his site, commenting, "The actions of Cosby's legal team are somewhat laughable, somewhat sad and ultimately symbolic of a quantum shift in the business of entertainment." Blogger Andy Baio made the series available via his website, waxy.org, beginning in November 2005, though he was also sent a letter from Cosby's attorney the following March. "I'm sure he despised it, which is sort of sad because we're all fans," said Roiland at the time.

The series received media attention upon the cease and desist letter, which resulted in Roiland—then "an unemployed 23-year-old"—gaining a talent agent and being signed to the United Talent Agency.

Episodes

Season 1 (2005)

"Unofficial" additional episodes
Before ending the series, Roiland enlisted friends Chester Tam, Chris Romano, and Eric Falconer to create an "unofficial" fifth episode of the series.

Reception
Erik Adams of The A.V. Club called it a "hilarious" show that "ended too soon, [and] proved to be as versatile as its clones."

References

External links
 Episode list at Channel 101.
 Waxy.org's refusal to take down House of Cosbys, claiming fair use, despite a Cease and Desist Letter.

2005 web series debuts
2005 web series endings
2000s American adult animated television series
2000s American black cartoons
2000s American black sitcoms
American adult animated comedy television series
American adult animated web series
Television series created by Justin Roiland
Computer-animated television series
Channel 101
Cultural depictions of Bill Cosby
Animation based on real people
Television series about cloning